Federico Bravo (Jesús María, 5 October 1993) is an Argentine professional footballer who plays for Sarmiento.

Club career

Boca Juniors
He is a youth exponent from the club. He made his team debut during the 2012/13 season. He is a defensive midfielder.

Loan to New York City
On 20 February 2016, Bravo joined New York City FC of Major League Soccer on loan for the 2016 season. He made his debut as a substitute for Khiry Shelton in the 89th minute of a 4–3 win against Chicago. His first start came a week later in a 2–2 draw with Toronto FC, picking up a yellow card.

Bravo received a red card on 10 September for a tackle on Gershon Koffie, in a 3–1 loss to New England.

Panetolikos
On 6 February 2017 he signed an 18-month contract with Panetolikos.

CA Patronato
Bravo signed for Patronato on 16 July 2018.

References

External links

1993 births
Living people
Argentine footballers
Argentine expatriate footballers
Boca Juniors footballers
New York City FC players
Panetolikos F.C. players
Club Atlético Patronato footballers
Atlético Tucumán footballers
C.D. Antofagasta footballers
Major League Soccer players
Argentine Primera División players
Chilean Primera División players
Sportspeople from Córdoba Province, Argentina
Association football defenders
Expatriate footballers in Chile
Expatriate soccer players in the United States
Expatriate footballers in Greece
Expatriate footballers in Latvia
Riga FC players
Club Atlético Sarmiento footballers